Sunday Scoop is a British lifestyle show that aired on ITV from 27 October to 29 December 2013 and was hosted by Nadia Sawalha and Kaye Adams. Peter Andre, Richard Bacon and Jeff Brazier also starred as the third presenter in the series.

External links

2013 British television series debuts
2013 British television series endings
Debate television series
English-language television shows
ITV (TV network) original programming
Television series by ITV Studios